András Róna-Tas (born 30 December 1931) is a Hungarian historian and linguist. He was born in 1931 in Budapest. Róna-Tas studied under such preeminent professors as Gyula Ortutay and Lajos Ligeti, and received a degree in folklore and eastern linguistics (Tibetan, Mongol, and Turkic.)

From 1956, he worked at the Faculty of Humanities of the Eötvös Loránd University. In 1957-58, Róna-Tas conducted anthropological fieldwork in Mongolia, studying the culture, language, and folklore of the nomadic tribes in that country. During the mid-1960s Róna-Tas focused his fieldwork on the Chuvash people of the middle Volga River basin. In 1964, Róna-Tas defended his candidates (CSc) degree, and finally in 1971 he earned a doctorate from the Hungarian Academy of Sciences (DSc) with his thesis "The Theory of Linguistic Affinity and the Linguistic Relations between the Chuvash and Mongol Languages", published as Linguistic Affinity in 1978.

From 1968-2002, Róna-Tas was professor of Altaic Studies and Early Hungarian History at József Attila University in Szeged, where he is now a distinguished professor emeritus. He has published over 450 papers, monographs and reviews. His magnum opus, The Landtaking Hungarians, was published in 1996 and an extended translated version appeared in English in 1999. 

In addition to his work on the early Magyars, Róna-Tas has published numerous works on other Eurasian societies such as the Tibetans, Kipchaks, Khazars, Oghuz Turks and Alans. He was awarded the prestigious Humboldt Prize in 1996.

Selected bibliography
"Turkic-Alanian-Hungarian contacts." (2005) (Journal Article in Acta Orientalia Academiae Scientiarum Hungaricae)
"Khitan word for 'marmot'." (2004) (Journal Article in Acta Orientalia Academiae Scientiarum Hungaricae)
"New publications on Uyghur texts translated from Chinese." (2003) (Journal Article in Acta Orientalia Academiae Scientiarum Hungaricae)
"Old Turkic Loan Words in Hungarian: Overview and Samples." (2002) (Journal Article in Acta Orientalia Academiae Scientiarum Hungaricae)
"Where was Khuvrat's Bulgharia?" (2000) (Journal Article in Acta Orientalia Academiae Scientiarum Hungaricae)
"Chuvash and historical morphology." (1999) (Journal Article in Acta Orientalia Academiae Scientiarum Hungaricae)
"The Migration and Landtaking of the Magyars." The Hungarian Quarterly, Volume XXXVII No. 144 Winter 1996

References

1931 births
Living people
Writers from Budapest
20th-century Hungarian historians
Linguists from Hungary
Khazar studies
Paleolinguists
Linguists of Turkic languages
Linguists of Altaic languages
21st-century Hungarian historians
Academic staff of the University of Szeged